Nazarka is a rural locality (a khutor) in Yurovskoye Rural Settlement, Gryazovetsky District, Vologda Oblast, Russia. The population was 1 as of 2002.

Geography 
Nazarka is located 30 km northwest of Gryazovets (the district's administrative centre) by road. Stepkovo is the nearest rural locality.

References 

Rural localities in Gryazovetsky District